Tyrsenian (also Tyrrhenian or Common Tyrrhenic), named after the Tyrrhenians (Ancient Greek, Ionic:  Tyrsenoi), is a proposed extinct family of closely related ancient languages put forward by linguist Helmut Rix (1998), which consists of the Etruscan language of northern, central and south-western Italy, and eastern Corsica (France); the Rhaetic language of the Alps, named after the Rhaetian people; and the Lemnian language of the Aegean Sea. Camunic in northern Lombardy, between Etruscan and Rhaetic, may belong to the family as well, but evidence of such is limited. The Tyrsenian languages are generally considered Pre-Indo-European and Paleo-European.

Classification 

In 1998 the German linguist Helmut Rix proposed that three then unclassified ancient languages belonged to a common linguistic family he called Tyrrhenian: the Etruscan language spoken in Etruria, the Rhaetic language of the southern Alps, and the Lemnian language, only attested by a small number of inscriptions from the Greek island of Lemnos in the Aegean Sea.

Rix's Tyrsenian family is supported by a number of linguists such as Stefan Schumacher, Carlo De Simone, Norbert Oettinger, Simona Marchesini, or Rex E. Wallace. Common features among Etruscan, Rhaetic, Lemnian have been found in morphology, phonology, and syntax. On the other hand, few lexical correspondences are documented, at least partly due to the scant number of Rhaetic and Lemnian texts and possibly also to the early date at which the languages split.

History 
Tyrsenian was probably a Paleo-European language family predating the arrival of Indo-European languages in Europe. Helmut Rix dated the end of the Proto-Tyrsenian period to the last quarter of the 2nd millennium BC. Carlo De Simone and Simona Marchesini have proposed a much earlier date, placing the Tyrsenian language split before the Bronze Age. This would provide one explanation for the low number of lexical correspondences.

In 2004 L. Bouke van der Meer proposed that Rhaetic could have split from Etruscan from around 900 BC or even earlier, at any rate no later than 700 BC since divergences are already present in the oldest Etruscan and Rhaetic inscriptions, such as in the grammatical voices of past tenses or in the endings of male gentilicia. From around 400 BCE, the Rhaeti became isolated from the Etruscan area by the Cisalpine Celts, thus limiting contacts between the two languages. Such a late datation has not enjoyed consensus, because the split would still be too recent, and in contrast with the archaeological data, the Rhaeti in the second Iron Age being characterized by the Fritzens-Sanzeno culture, in continuity with late Bronze Age culture and early Iron Age Laugen-Melaun culture. The Raeti are not believed, archeologically, to descend from the Etruscans, as well as it is not believed plausible that the Etruscans are descended from the Rhaeti, while the relationship between the Etruscan and Rhaetic languages is thought to date back to a remote stage of prehistory.

After more than 90 years of archaeological excavations at Lemnos, nothing has been found that would support a migration from Lemnos to Etruria or to the Alps where Rhaetic was spoken. The indigenous inhabitants of Lemnos, also called in ancient times Sinteis, were the Sintians, a Thracian population. While the results of the previous excavations indicate that the Early Iron Age inhabitants of Lemnos could be a remnant of a Mycenaean population and, in addition, the earliest attested reference to Lemnos is the Mycenaean Greek ra-mi-ni-ja, "Lemnian woman", written in Linear B syllabic script. Scholars such as Norbert Oettinger, Michel Gras and Carlo De Simone think that Lemnian is the testimony of an Etruscan commercial settlement on the island that took place before 700 BC, not related to the Sea Peoples. Alternatively, the Lemnian language could have arrived in the Aegean Sea during the Late Bronze Age, when Mycenaean rulers recruited groups of mercenaries from Sicily, Sardinia and various parts of the Italian peninsula.

A 2021 archeogenetic analysis of Etruscan individuals who lived between 800 BC and 1 BC concluded that the Etruscans may have been descendants of the populations that were widespread in Europe from at least the Neolithic period before the arrival of Indo-Europeans, as already argued by German geneticist Johannes Krause who concluded that it is likely that the Etruscan language (as well as Basque, Paleo-Sardinian and Minoan) "developed on the continent in the course of the Neolithic Revolution". The lack of recent Anatolian-related admixture and Iranian-related ancestry among the Etruscans, who genetically joined firmly to the European cluster, might also suggest that the presence of a handful of inscriptions found at Lemnos, in a language related to Etruscan and Rhaetic, "could represent population movements departing from the Italian peninsula".

Strabo's (Geography V, 2) citation from Anticlides attributes a share in the foundation of Etruria to the Pelasgians of Lemnos and Imbros. The Pelasgians are also referred to by Herodotus as settlers in Lemnos, after they were expelled from Attica by the Athenians. Apollonius of Rhodes mentioned an ancient settlement of Tyrrhenians on Lemnos in his Argonautica (IV.1760), written in the third century BC, in an elaborate invented aition of Kalliste or Thera: in passing, he attributes the flight of Sintian Lemnians to the island Kalliste to "Tyrrhenian warriors" from the island of Lemnos.

Languages 
 Etruscan: 13,000 inscriptions, the overwhelming majority of which have been found in Italy; the oldest Etruscan inscription dates back to the 8th century BC, and the most recent one is dated to the 1st century AD.
 Rhaetic: 300 inscriptions, the overwhelming majority of which have been found in the Central Alps; the oldest Rhaetic inscription dates back to the 6th century BC.
 Lemnian: 2 inscriptions plus a small number of extremely fragmentary inscriptions; the oldest Lemnian inscription dates back to the late 6th century BC.
 Camunic: may be related to Rhaetic; about 170 inscriptions found in the Central Alps; the oldest Camunic inscriptions dates back to the 5th century BC.

Evidence 
Cognates common to Rhaetic and Etruscan are:
 

Cognates common to Etruscan and Lemnian are:
 shared dative-case suffixes *-si, and *-ale
 attested as  Etruscan 'to Aule' on the Cippus Perusinus inscriptions
 attested as  Lemnian 'for Hulaie',  'for the Phocaean' on the Lemnos Stele
 a past tense suffix *-a-i
 - as in  'was' ( ← *amai) in Etruscan
 - as in  'lived' in Lemnian
 two cognate words describing ages
  Etruscan 'and aged sixty-five'
  Lemnian 'aged sixty'

Fringe scholarship and superseded theories

Aegean language family 
A larger Aegean family including Eteocretan, Minoan and Eteocypriot has been proposed by G. M. Facchetti referring to some alleged similarities between on the one hand Etruscan and Lemnian, and on the other hand languages like Minoan and Eteocretan. If these languages could be shown to be related to Etruscan and Rhaetic, they would constitute a pre-Indo-European language family stretching from (at the very least) the Aegean islands and Crete across mainland Greece and the Italian peninsula to the Alps. A proposed relation between these languages has also been made previously by Raymond A. Brown. Michael Ventris, who successfully deciphered Linear B with John Chadwick, also thought there to be a relation between Etruscan and Minoan. Facchetti proposes a hypothetical language family derived from Minoan in two branches. From Minoan he proposes a Proto-Tyrrhenian from which would have come the Etruscan, Lemnian and Rhaetic languages. James Mellaart has proposed that this language family is related to the pre-Indo-European languages of Anatolia, based upon place name analysis. From another Minoan branch would have come the Eteocretan language. T. B. Jones proposed in 1950 reading of Eteocypriot texts in Etruscan, which was refuted by most scholars but gained popularity in the former Soviet Union. In any case, a relationship between the Etruscan language and the Minoan (including Eteocretan and Eteocypriot) is considered unfounded.

Anatolian languages 
A relation with the Anatolian languages within Indo-European has been proposed, but is not accepted. If these languages are an early Indo-European stratum rather than pre-Indo-European, they would be associated with Krahe's Old European hydronymy and would date back to a Kurganization during the early Bronze Age.

Northeast Caucasian languages 
A number of mainly Soviet or post-Soviet linguists, including Sergei Starostin, suggested a link between the Tyrrhenian languages and the Northeast Caucasian languages in an Alarodian language family, based on claimed sound correspondences between Etruscan, Hurrian, and Northeast Caucasian languages, numerals, grammatical structures and phonologies. Most linguists, however, either doubt that the language families are related, or believe that the evidence is far from conclusive.

Extinction 
The language group seems to have died out around the 3rd century BC in the Aegean (by assimilation of the speakers to Greek), and as regards Etruscan around the 1st century AD in Italy (by assimilation to Latin). The latest Rhaetic inscriptions are dated to the 1st century BC.

See also 
 Camunic language (possibly related to Raetic)
 North Picene language
 Elymian language (probably Indo-European or related to it)
 Sicanian language
 Paleo-Sardinian language (also called Paleosardinian, Protosardic, Nuraghic language)
 Old European hydronymy

Notes

References

Sources 

 
 
 
 
 
 
 
 
 
 
 
 .
 

 
Pre-Indo-Europeans
Proposed language families